The second season of Veronica Mars, an American drama television series created by Rob Thomas, premiered on UPN in the United States on September 28, 2005. The series was produced by Warner Bros. Television, Silver Pictures Television and Rob Thomas Productions, and Joel Silver and Thomas served as the executive producers.

The season begins with the introduction of two new cases: when a school bus full of Neptune High students plunges off a cliff, killing almost everyone on board, Veronica Mars (Kristen Bell) makes it her mission to discover why the bus crashed. Logan Echolls (Jason Dohring) is accused of killing a Pacific Coast Highway (PCH) biker gang member after a drunken fight with Eli "Weevil" Navarro (Francis Capra) and the PCHers.

The series was critically acclaimed, and appeared on several fall television best lists. The second season garnered an average of 2.3 million viewers per all 22 episodes in the US. Out of all regular primetime programming that aired during the 2005–2006 American television season, Veronica Mars ranked 145th out of 156, according to the Nielsen ratings system. The premiere was watched by 3.30 million viewers, while the finale was watched by 2.42 million viewers.

Cast and crew

The second season was produced by Warner Bros. Television, Silver Pictures Television and Rob Thomas Productions. Joel Silver and Thomas served as the executive producers, and Jennifer Gwartz, Danielle Stokdyk and Diane Ruggiero served as co-executive producers. The season's crew also included producers Howard Grisby and Dan Etheridge, co-producer Stacy Fields, head writer Dayna Lynne North, and casting director Deedee Bradley.

The second season features a cast of nine actors who receive star billing, six of whom were regulars in the first season. Kristen Bell portrays the titular Veronica Mars, a high school senior and skilled private detective. Teddy Dunn plays Duncan Kane, Veronica's ex-boyfriend and Lilly's brother. Jason Dohring plays Logan Echolls, the "bad-boy" son of an A-list actor and an "09er", a group of wealthy students from the fictional 90909 ZIP code. Percy Daggs III portrays Wallace Fennel, Veronica's best friend and frequent partner in solving mysteries. Francis Capra portrays Eli "Weevil" Navarro, the leader of the PCH Biker gang and Veronica's friend. Enrico Colantoni plays Veronica's father Keith Mars, a private investigator and former Balboa County Sheriff.

Thomas, who said that he "conceive[d] the show as a one-year mystery", decided that he needed to introduce and eliminate several characters to be able to create an "equally fascinating mystery" for the series' second season. Thomas felt that he could not bring back the Kanes and the Echolls and "have them all involved in a new mystery"; he needed "new blood". The second season saw the introduction of Tessa Thompson as Jackie Cook, a romantic interest of Wallace and daughter of a famous baseball player. Previous recurring characters Dick Casablancas and Cassidy "Beaver" Casablancas were upgraded to series regulars. Dick, played by Ryan Hansen, was an 09er friend of Logan, a womanizer and former high-school bully turned frat boy. Kyle Gallner portrayed "Beaver", Dick's introverted younger brother. Dunn, who played Duncan Kane, left the series midway through the season. Thomas explained that the Logan–Veronica–Duncan love triangle had run its course, and to keep the series fresh, there would need to be "other guys in her life". He attributed Dunn's removal to fan interest dominating the Logan–Veronica relationship, saying "it became clear that one suitor won out".

Episodes 
The season begins with Veronica's life returning to the way it was before Lilly's death: having broken up with Logan during the summer, she reunites with Duncan and is somewhat accepted by the 09ers. However, her tough personality and work as a private investigator keep her from being truly assimilated back into the rich crowd. 09ers Dick and Cassidy are abandoned by their father, who flees the country while under investigation for real estate fraud. The brothers are forced to deal with their stepmother, Kendall (Charisma Carpenter), who is only interested in their father's money. Wallace discovers that his biological father is alive and takes a romantic interest in Jackie.

Reception

Critical response
The review aggregator website Rotten Tomatoes reported an approval rating of 92% with an average score of 8.67/10, based on 12 reviews. The website's critics consensus reads, "She may have solved the murder of her best friend, but everyone's favorite teen sleuth still has plenty of high school drama and danger to go around in Veronica Mars' successful second season."

Brian Raftery of Entertainment Weekly praised the cast as ingenious, in particular Bell and Colantoni, who he thought kept the season "humming along". Raftery found their characters' "sweet-natured, genuine father-daughter friendship remains the show's rock-hard axis". Eric Goldman of IGN wrote that the season was "entertaining start to finish", with "great" returning characters and a "wonderful array of guest stars". Goldman criticized the main mysteries for not having the "same personal touchstone for Veronica or for the audience", but found the pace pick[ed] up considerably in the final episodes". The reviewer called Bell's performance "Emmy-worthy", showing "an amazing amount of different emotions throughout the season, while maintaining Veronica's trademark wit and cleverness".

Jeff Swindoll of Monsters and Critics found that the focus was less on Veronica than in the first season. Swindoll wrote that although the ongoing bus crash mystery lacked the personal touch of season one, other characters were given more screen time and the narrative was still interesting and enjoyable. Reviewers for UGO Networks declared the second season "much more captivating than its freshman predecessor". Despite the positive reviews, numerous critics were frustrated with the complexity of the second season. Entertainment Weekly thought that the season contained "way-too-ancillary characters and red-herring subplots so extraneous that even the most ardent followers needed a Wikipedic memory to keep track of things". Robert Bianco of USA Today felt that the season was "lost in an overly complex plot".

Awards
The second season was nominated for nine awards, winning two. Kristen Bell and Enrico Colantoni were awarded with the Family Television Award for Favorite Father/Daughter. The series was nominated for the International Cinematographers Guild Publicists Award for The Maxwell Weinberg Publicist Showmanship Award for Television, and the Saturn Award for Best Network Television Series. Kristen Bell won the Saturn Award for Best Television Actress, was nominated for the Satellite Award for Actress in a Drama Series, and the Teen Choice Award for Choice TV Actress: Drama/Action Adventure. Percy Daggs III and Enrico Colantoni were respectively nominated for the Teen Choice Awards for Choice TV Sidekick and Choice TV Parental Unit. Rob Thomas was nominated for a Writers Guild of America Award for Episodic Drama for his work on "Normal Is the Watchword".

Distribution

The second season was released in the US under the title Veronica Mars: The Complete Second Season as a widescreen six-disc Region 1 DVD box set on August 22, 2006, Region 2 on August 15, 2008, and Region 4 on September 8, 2008. In addition to all of the aired episodes, DVD extras included a gag reel, a promo trailer for the third season, deleted and additional scenes, including an alternate ending to "My Mother, the Fiend", and two featurettes: "A Day on the Set with Veronica Mars" and "Veronica Mars: Not Your Average Teen Detective". IGN's Goldman was displeased with the minimal number of extras, and criticized the crew for the lack of commentaries. The reviewer felt that although the DVD was worth the episodes alone, the few extras made the set a disappointment. Contrastingly, reviewers for UGO Networks wrote that the DVD box set was as engaging as the season's episodes.

The CTV Television Network, which began airing the first season in Canada in May 2005, decided not to pick up the second season. Instead, Sun TV began broadcasting the season on July 18, 2006. Living began airing the second season in the United Kingdom on June 8, 2006, airing one episode per week rather than showing one every night as they did in the first season. Despite "underwhelming" ratings, Living picked up the series' third season. Network Ten broadcast the second season in Australia on Fridays in 2007.

References
General

 
 

Specific

External links
 
 
 Mars Investigations

Veronica Mars episodes
2005 American television seasons
2006 American television seasons